Dragoş Vodă may refer to:

 Dragoş
 Dragoș Vodă, Călărași